Jason Warner (born 1975) and DeMarco DeCiccio (born 1976) are a Christian musical duo (and life partners) with outreach to the LGBT community.

Background 
Robert Jason Nicewarner, who changed his name to "Jason Warner" before becoming a duo with deMarco, is a 1997 graduate of Lee University in Tennessee, and comes from a Pentecostal faith background. Marco DeCiccio, who is now known as deMarco, grew up a Roman Catholic, is a native of Canada and a 1999 graduate of York University.

Jason and deMarco met in 2001 in Hollywood, California. Before launching their duo act, deMarco was a lead in the international touring company of the musical "California Dream Men" and Jason was a Christian artist in mainline traditional Gospel groups, and then as a solo artist touring mostly through Metropolitan Community Church, gay-accepting churches. The duo released their first album together, The Spirit of Christmas, in 2002 followed by 2003's Songs for the Spirit. In 2004, they appeared on the cover of The Advocate magazine with their new album Spirit Pop. In early 2005, they started working with Letthead Productions, a recording studio and production company based in Houston. They  released their fourth album, Till the End of Time, produced by Alan Lett, with additional production from Joe Hogue, Eddie X and Luigie Gonzalez. Seven of the album's twelve songs are written by Jason and deMarco.

Jason and deMarco's first single, "Trying to Get to You," climbed the Billboard Charts and their second single, "This is Love", won "Music Video of the Year 2006" on MTV's LOGO.  A full-length feature documentary film entitled We're All Angels premiered at NewFest 2007 (the 19th Annual New York LGBT Film Festival), and at Outfest 2007 (the 25th Los Angeles Gay and Lesbian Film Festival). They have a fan club "The Angel Club," based on the We're All Angels documentary.

In 2007, Jason joined the staff at Unity Church of Christianity in Houston, Texas under the leadership of Rev. Howard Caesar.  He is a Young Adult and Youth Leader as well as a Contemporary Worship Leader, performing with deMarco.

The couple married in Los Angeles in 2008 prior to the passage of Proposition 8.

Discography
Albums
 2002: The Spirit of Christmas
 2003: Songs for the Spirit
 2004: Spirit Pop
 2006: Till the End of Time
 2007: Halo
 2008: Safe
 2011: The Oneness of Praise

EPs
 2006: Trying to Get to You: Remixes

Singles
 2006: Trying to Get to You
 2006: This Is Love
 2008: Safe
 2008: It's Okay

Solo recordings - Jason Warner 
  Only a Whisper
  Mercy Said No
  In the Waiting
  Still

Solo recordings - deMarco
  Melodie
  deMarco  (EP)

Video Releases
 2007: This Is Love
 2008: Safe
 2009: We're All Angels

References

External links
Jason and deMarco home page
Jason and deMarco's Angel Fan Club

LGBT-themed musical groups
American LGBT musicians
American musical duos
LGBT Christians
Married couples
American Christian musical groups
Musical groups established in 2002
2002 establishments in California
Same-sex couples